Griffin & Howe, Inc. is an American firearms manufacturer headquartered in Andover, New Jersey. Founded in 1923 by Seymour Griffin, a New York City cabinetmaker, and James V. Howe, foreman of the machine shop at the Frankford Arsenal in Pennsylvania.

History 
Griffin was employed as the in-house carpenter and cabinetmaker at the Hotel Bretton Hall in Manhattan at 2346 Broadway. In 1910 Griffin, having read of the African safari of Theodore Roosevelt and his use of a sporterized Springfield 30-06, decided to turn his own Springfield rifle into a sporter. He purchased a French walnut blank from Von Lengerke & Detmold. In his spare time at the woodwork shop of Bretton Hall, Griffin continued to produce restocked Springfield rifles.

Colonel Townsend Whelen who was then in command of the Frankford Arsenal in Philadelphia, Pennsylvania. played a large role in the inception of the company.  In April 1923 Col. Whelen told Griffin about the talents of the head of the machine shop at the arsenal, James Virgil Howe, and suggested that they combine their skills to produce custom rifles. Also assisting, and providing the necessary startup capital, were James M. Holsworth, and James L. Gerry. On June 1, 1923 Griffin & Howe opened its doors and built rifles out of a New York City loft.

In 1927 the Griffin & Howe Sidemount scopemount was introduced. This mount allowed for a  mounted and sighted scope to be removed and replaced without the zero being affected.

Griffin & Howe was bought by Abercrombie & Fitch in 1930. Griffin & Howe became the main firearm and gunroom of the outfitter for the next 45 years. From the 1930s to the 1960s, G&H supplied sporting rifles to customers including Ernest Hemingway, Clark Gable, Bing Crosby, Dwight D. Eisenhower, and Robert C. Ruark.

In 1935 Griffin & Howe had opened the first shooting school in the U.S., at what is now the Orvis Shooting Grounds in Sandanona, New York.

During World War II, G&H was forced to discontinue its rifle business and turned to making the triggers for US anti-aircraft guns, along with over 50 different parts for the American aircraft industry. In addition to this, the G&H side mount became the standard rifle mount for the M1 Garand rifle, and by the end of the war, 23,000 had been delivered to the Springfield Armory.

In 1976, G&H was sold by Abercrombie & Fitch to longtime employee, Bill Ward. The company moved its headquarters to Bernardsville, New Jersey in 1987, with the present management taking over in 1989. The company opened two new locations in Greenwich, Connecticut in 1999 and in 2003 at its Shooting School at the Hudson Farm Club in Andover.

In 2011 Griffin & Howe moved its gunsmithing operations to a newly renovated,  facility to alongside the Shooting School at the Hudson Farm Club. In 2015, the company brought all of its operations to its shooting school location in Andover, NJ.

References

External links 
 Official page

Firearm manufacturers of the United States
Companies based in Sussex County, New Jersey
1923 establishments in New York City
Manufacturing companies established in 1923